The 2020–21 EHF European League was the 1st edition of the EHF European League, replacing the EHF Cup as the second most important European handball club competition organised by the European Handball Federation (EHF), which had been in existence for 39 years.

Team allocation
A total of 51 teams from 21 countries participated in the 2020–21 EHF European League.

Teams

Round and draw dates
The schedule of the competition was as follows.

Qualifying rounds

First qualifying round

Seeding
A total of 30 teams were involved in the first qualifying round draw, they were divided into three geographical zones, each one with two pots of five teams, to limit travel distances and to reduce possible travel restrictions amid the COVID-19 pandemic. Teams from the same country could not be drawn into the same tie.

Matches

|}

Second qualifying round

Seeding
A total of 24 teams were involved in the second qualifying round draw, 15 advancing from the previous round and 9 teams entering this round. Teams were divided in two pots and were drawn without any restrictions.

Matches

|}

Group stage

Seeding
The 24 teams were divided into six pots of four teams, with a team from each pot being drawn to each group. Teams from the same country could not be drawn into the same group.

Tiebreakers
Teams were ranked according to points (2 points for a win, 1 point for a draw, 0 points for a loss), and if tied on points, the following tiebreaking criteria were applied, in the order given, to determine the rankings:
Points in matches among tied teams;
Goal difference in matches among tied teams;
Away goals scored in matches among tied teams;
Goal difference in all group matches;
Goals scored in all group matches;
If more than two teams were tied, and after applying all head-to-head criteria above, a subset of teams were still tied, all head-to-head criteria above were reapplied exclusively to this subset of teams;
Drawing lots.

Group A

Group B

Group C

Group D

Knockout stage
The pairings for the last 16 and the quarter-finals are based on group stage standings, according to the following bracket. This assures teams from the same group can only play each other again in the final four.

Last 16
The last 16 first legs were scheduled for 23 March 2021, while the second legs followed on 30 March 2021.

|}

Quarter-finals
The quarter-finals first legs were scheduled for 13 April 2021, while the second legs followed on 20 April 2021.

|}

Final four
The EHF Finals Men 2021 was played on 22 and 23 May 2021 in Mannheim, Germany and comprised one leg semifinals, final and third-place match. The pairings for the semifinals were decided by drawing of lots.

Bracket

Semifinals

Third-place game

Final

Top goalscorers

See also
2020–21 EHF Champions League

Notes

References

External links
Official website

EHF Cup seasons
EHF European League
EHF European League